Zakaria Medjdoub Stadium is a football stadium in El Bayadh, Algeria. The stadium holds 15,000 people. It serves as a home ground for MC El Bayadh which plays in Algerian Ligue Professionnelle 1.

References

Football venues in Algeria
Buildings and structures in El Bayadh Province